Playa Grande (lit. "Big Beach"), also known as Salinas, is a beach community on the Pacific coast of Costa Rica just north of Tamarindo. It is located inside the canton of Santa Cruz in Guanacaste Province. Playa Grande has been part of the Parque Nacional Marino Las Baulas (Las Baulas Marine National Park) since 1990.

Las Baulas Marine National Park

Las Baulas is Costa Rica's nesting site for the leatherback sea turtle and was created to protect their declining population. The park is home to 117 tree and shrub species and 139 bird species.

Beach
Playa Grande is a Costa Rican beach which is known for its sandy bottom and waves, there are several surf breaks from the shore that make the location popular for swimming and surfing.

References

Populated places in Guanacaste Province
Surfing locations in Costa Rica